The 2014 Rostelecom Cup was the fourth event of six in the 2014–15 ISU Grand Prix of Figure Skating, a senior-level international invitational competition series. It was held at the Luzhniki Small Sports Arena in Moscow on November 14–16. Medals were awarded in the disciplines of men's singles, ladies' singles, pair skating, and ice dancing. Skaters earned points toward qualifying for the 2014–15 Grand Prix Final.

Entries
The entries were as follows:

Changes to initial lineup
 On July 2, it was announced that Stefania Berton / Ondrej Hotarek had split up. On August 4, their replacement was announced as Annabelle Prolss / Ruben Blommaert.
 On July 10, Vanessa Lam was removed from the roster. No reason was given. On July 15, it was announced that Ashley Cain had been named as her replacement.
 On August 13, Maylin Wende / Daniel Wende were removed from the roster due to an injury to Daniel. On August 29, Narumi Takahashi / Ryuichi Kihara were announced as replacements.
 On August 29, Artur Gachinski, Nikol Gosviani and Evgenia Tarasova / Vladimir Morozov were announced as host picks.
 On September 8, Valentina Marchei was removed from the roster due to an injury. On September 17, Rika Hongo was announced as her replacement.
 On October 2, Julia Zlobina / Alexei Sitnikov withdrew. No reason has been given. On October 7, Rebeka Kim / Kirill Minov were announced as their replacements.
 On October 14, Nikol Gosviani was replaced by Maria Artemieva. No reason has been given.
 On October 17, Tarah Kayne / Daniel O'Shea were removed from the roster due to lack of training time. On October 24, Jessica Calalang / Zack Sidhu were announced as their replacements.
 On October 28, Nathalie Weinzierl was removed from the roster due to an injury. On October 30, Eliška Březinová was announced as her replacement.
 On November 5, Alexander Majorov was removed from the roster. On November 11, Misha Ge was announced as his replacement.
 On November 7, there were a few substitutions to the roster. Adelina Sotnikova and Mikhail Kolyada withdrew due to an injury. Vasilisa Davankova / Alexander Enbert withdrew to due health problems. They were replaced by Maria Stavitskaya, Moris Kvitelashvili, and Kristina Astakhova / Alexei Rogonov respectively.

Results

Men

Ladies

Pairs

Ice dancing

References

External links
 2014 Rostelecom Cup at the International Skating Union
 Starting orders and result details

2014 in figure skating
Rostelecom Cup
2014 in Russian sport